The Marumalarchi Dravida Munnetra Kazhagam ( 'Renaissance Dravidian Progressive Federation') is a political party active in the Indian states of Tamil Nadu and Puducherry. It was established by Vaiko in 1994 after he left the Dravida Munnetra Kazhagam.

History

Formation
Vaiko was a member of Rajya Sabha and a party activist of Dravida Munnetra Kazhagam (DMK). Vaiko grew in the party from his student days and actively participated in the party agitations and courted imprisonment several times. He was elected thrice to the Rajya Sabha. In 1994, he was forced out of the parent body as he was seen as a threat to DMK chief Karunanidhi's son, M.K. Stalin. Vaiko along with some district secretaries announced the decision to start a rival party, which became the MDMK.

Support for Sri Lankan Tamils
Vaiko voiced support for Tamils during the Sri Lankan Civil War, including for the Liberation Tigers of Tamil Eelam specifically and their goal of secession from Sri Lanka.

Support for the Mullaperiyar Dam
Kerala government was keen to demolish the Mullaperiyar Dam because of safety concerns. However, the dam's reservoir is a prime source for irrigation for more than 8 districts including Theni. As a result, Vaiko led an agitation against Kerala government.

Split in MDMK
With the looming possibility of a vote of confidence in Parliament against UPA, two party MPs, L. Ganesan and Gingee N. Ramachandran, claimed that they enjoy the support of the majority of party cadre and decided to pledge support to the UPA government. They later withdrew their claim and joined DMK when it was found that they had forged letters of support of party executives.

Boycott of Assembly Election 2011
Due to issues in seat sharing, MDMK quit the ADMK Alliance and boycotted the 2011 Assembly elections of Tamil Nadu and Puducherry.

Sanchi Protest
The MDMK protested the Sri Lankan President Mahinda Rajapaksa's visit to Sanchi, Madhya Pradesh in September 2012. Vaiko and his party members traveled to Sanchi. People who traveled through roadways were stopped by the police near Gadchiroli. Some party members tried to reach the spot by rail and air but they were detained by police before reaching Sanchi.

MDMK snap ties with NDA
The MDMK left the BJP-led National Democratic Alliance in December 2014, accusing the BJP of acting against Tamil interests. This came after heavy criticism of the party from BJP lawmaker Subramanian Swamy.

Party flag and symbol
The election symbol is a top. The colour of the top and bottom panel is red and middle panel is black. The party has a weekly journal called Sangoli which carries news and write ups for party workers.

Election history
They contested in many elections and won in a few and boycotted 2011 elections, and despite the UPA alliance in which they were in winning majority seats in Tamil Nadu and all over India in 2004 elections, in 2014 elections they couldn't do the same in Tamil Nadu, despite their alliance winning the elections in other states. And in 2016 tamil nadu state elections they played a key role in forming the third front.

2017 R. K. Nagar by-poll

After the defeat 2016 Elections, MDMK has slowly move towards DMK. Before R.K.Nagar bypoll Marumalarchi Dravida Munnetra Kazhagam (MDMK) announced their support to the Dravida Munnetra Kazhagam (DMK) in the Assembly by-poll. The alliance with DMK defined as a significant change because MDMK made an alliance with DMK after a decade.

2019 Indian Parliamentary Elections

MDMK continues its alliance with DMK, and they got one Lok Sabha seat. Former Member of Parliament Ganeshamurthi, from Erode constituency, once again won. In this election, DMK alliance wins 38 out of 39 Lok Sabha seats in Tamil Nadu. MDMK gets one Lok Sabha seat and one Rajya Sabha seats, Lok Sabha seat allocated for former parliament member Ganeshamurthi and Rajya sabha seat allocated to General Secretary Vaiko. Vaiko entered Parliament again after 15 years.

References

External links 
 Official Website of the party
 MDMK profile listed in Library of congress

 
Dravidian political parties
Political parties established in 1994
Political parties in Tamil Nadu
1994 establishments in Tamil Nadu